Xuasus is the pseudonym of Spanish comicbook artist Juan Jesus Garcia (Mieres, 1968).

Biography
Xuasus' chunky, fully painted style was admired by David Bishop, editor of the Judge Dredd Megazine, in the early 1990s, and the artist was commissioned to work on a number of well-known characters, including Judge Dredd, Judge Anderson, Judge Hershey and the Brit-Cit Brute.  Xuasus has also contributed to the Teenage Mutant Ninja Turtles and Victor titles.

His latest contribution is the "Waccy Baccy Races" series for the magazine Wasted in collaboration with Alan Grant. He now combines his work in comics with film projects.

He worked as a matte painter and VFX Art Director on the cities of Jerusalem and the Castle of Kerak on Kingdom of Heaven. He also created the virtual Waterfall City for Dinotopia and was a matte painter on Troy, Rome and Harry Potter II. He now works in Vancouver, Canada as a matte painter.

Works

Bibliography
Comics work includes:

Judge Hershey (in Judge Dredd Megazine vol.2 #12, 1992)
Judge Dredd (in Judge Dredd Megazine vol.2 #19, 21, 27-29 & 34-35, 1993)
Judge Anderson (in Judge Dredd Megazine vol.2 #54-56, 1994)
Teenage Mutant Ninja Turtles
Commando
Victor
X-Bow
France Routes
Bonty
La Nueva Espana
Wild Crew
Lletres Asturianes

Partial filmography
300: Rise of an Empire
 Seventh Son
 Percy Jackson: Sea of Monsters
 The Lone Ranger
 Man of Steel
 Jack the Giant Slayer
 Life of Pi
 Sherlock Holmes: A Game of Shadows
 The Borgias
 Priest
 Fast Five
 Battle Los Angeles
 Piranha
 Kingdom of Heaven
Inkheart
The Golden Compass
Underdog
Rome
Troy
Harry Potter II
Dinotopia

References

2000 AD profile

External links

1968 births
Living people
People from Mieres, Asturias
Spanish comics artists